Banglar Mati Banglar Jol (Bengali:- বাংলার মাটি বাংলার জল; English:- "Soil of Bengal, Water of Bengal") is a Bengali patriotic song written by Rabindranath Tagore. It was composed in 1905. It was written supporting the "Bangabhanga Rodh Movement" in Bengal. Tagore started "Raksha Bandhan Utsav" on 16 October 1905 to reunite Hindu and Muslim Bengalis protesting the Partition of Bengal (1905) and on that day, this song was the motto of the movement. The notation of the song was given by Indira Debi Chowdhurani.

Lyrics in Bengali 
বাংলার মাটি, বাংলার জল,
বাংলার বায়ু, বাংলার ফল
পুণ্য হউক পুণ্য হউক
পুণ্য হউক হে ভগবান।

বাংলার ঘর, বাংলার হাট,
বাংলার বন, বাংলার মাঠ
পূর্ণ হউক পূর্ণ হউক
পূর্ণ হউক হে ভগবান।

বাঙালির পণ, বাঙালির আশা,
বাঙালির কাজ, বাঙালির ভাষা
সত্য হউক সত্য হউক
সত্য হউক, হে ভগবান।

বাঙালির প্রাণ, বাঙালির মন,
বাঙালির ঘরে যত ভাই বোন
এক হউক এক হউক
এক হউক হে ভগবান।

Transliteration in English 
Banglar mati, banglar jol,
Banglar baayu, banglar phal
Punyo hauk  punyo hauk
punyo hauk  hey bhagoban.

Banglar ghar, banglar haat,
banglar bon, banglar maath
Purno hauk  purno hauk
purno hauk  hey bhagoban.

Bangalir pon, bangalir asha,
bangalir kaaj, bangalir bhasa
Sotyo hauk  sotyo hauk
sotyo hauk  hey bhagoban.

Bangalir praan, bangalir mon,
bangalir ghare  jato bhai bon
Ek hauk  ek hauk
ek hauk  hey bhagoban.

See also 
 Bangamata

References

External links  

 rabindra-rachanabali.nltr.org (in Bengali)

Rabindra Sangeet
Songs written by Rabindranath Tagore
Indian patriotic songs
Rabindranath Tagore
Bengali-language songs
1905 songs
Protest songs